Acolmiztli I ("Arm of the Puma" in Nahuatl) was a tlatoani (ruler or king) of Coatlichan, Nahua altepetl (city-state).

Family 
Acolmiztli was a son of a Chieftain named Tzompantzin and was married to the Princess Cihuateotzin of Cohuatlichan, who bore him a daughter, the Princess Tozquentzin of Cohuatlichan. Princess Tozquentzin married the King of Texcoco, Techotlalatzin. Acolmiztli was also married to Tlazozomizqui. Their daughters were Queen Acxocueitl and Queen Xiuhtomiyauhtzin.

He was a grandfather of kings Tlacateotl and Tezozomoctli (Cuauhtitlan) and queens Matlalatzin and Huacaltzintli.

Lineage from Coatlichan 
This is a family tree of Acolhua's rulers according to Fernando de Alva Ixtlilxochitl, including the Coatlichan's Rulers. 

Inside the green boxes is the Coatlichan's lineage with bold text. The others with dates are from the Tetzcoco's lineage.

References

Tlatoque